James Adriano Mitri (born 28 February 1999 in London) is a British-born New Zealand professional cyclist, who currently rides for UCI Continental team .

References

External links

1999 births
Living people
English male cyclists
New Zealand male cyclists
Cyclists from Greater London